Shardza Tashi Gyaltsen (1859 - 1933 or 1935) was a great Dzogchen master of the Bon tradition of Tibet who took not only Bon disciples, but gathered students from all traditions of Tibetan Buddhism.

According to tradition, Shardza Tashi Gyeltsen famously realized the rainbow body.

Chaoul (2006) opened the discourse of Bon traditions of Trul khor into Western scholarship in English with his thesis from Rice University, which makes reference to writings of Shardza Tashi Gyaltsen, particularly the Most Profound Heavenly Storehouse None Other than the Oral Transmission of Trul Khor Energy Control Practices.

Literary works
'The Self-Dawning of the Three Bodies'
byang zab nam mkha' mdzod chen las snyan rgyud rtsa rlung 'phrul 'khor (a Commentary on Trul Khor)

See also

Tonpa Shenrab Miwoche
Tapihritsa

Notes

References
Lopön Tenzin Namdak and Dixey, Richard (2002). Heart Drops of Dharmakaya:  Dzogchen Practice of the Bön Tradition. Snow Lion Publications.  
Gorvine, William M. (2006). The Life of a Bonpo Luminary: Sainthood, Partisanship and Literary Representation in a 20th Century Tibetan Biography. Dissertation. University of Virginia: Department of Religious Studies. Source:  (accessed: Saturday October 31, 2009)
Jean-Luc Achard (2008). Enlightened Rainbows: The Life and Works of Shardza Tashi Gyeltsen. Brill's Tibetan Studies Library. .

1859 births
1930s deaths
Tibetan people
Bon